Mukesh Kumar (born 12 October 1993) is an Indian cricketer who plays for Bengal. He got his maiden call-up for Indian cricket team in September 2022 against South Africa. He made his first-class debut on 30 October in the 2015–16 Ranji Trophy. He made his List A debut on 13 December 2015 in the 2015–16 Vijay Hazare Trophy. He made his Twenty20 debut on 6 January 2016 in the 2015–16 Syed Mushtaq Ali Trophy. In December 2022, earned his maiden call-up to the Indian cricket team for their Twenty20 International (T20I) series against Sri Lanka.

See also
 List of Bengal cricketers
 5 Interesting Facts about Mukesh Kumar

References

External links
 

1993 births
Living people
Indian cricketers
Bengal cricketers
Cricketers from Kolkata